Kenneth Lovelace (born August 18, 1936) is an American guitarist and singer best known for his tenure with Jerry Lee Lewis since 1966.

Life
Lovelace was born in Cloverdale, Alabama. He grew up in a small village 12 miles from Florence, where his family worked on a farm. Lovelace hooked up with a band called the Go-Go-Boys, who later changed their name to The Five Jets. He was with them for twelve years.

While playing in Monroe, Louisiana, he met rock and roll legend Jerry Lee Lewis, through Jerry's sister Linda Gail Lewis. Lewis wanted to hire the whole band, but the others had families to look after, so Jerry hired Kenny. He has been guitarist and band leader of the Memphis Beats for more than 40 years.  Kenny lives in Nashville, Tennessee with his wife.

Lovelace has also recorded with artists such as Johnny Cash and Carl Perkins.

References

American rock guitarists
American male guitarists
American rock singers
1936 births
Living people
Musicians from Montgomery, Alabama
Guitarists from Alabama
Rockabilly guitarists
20th-century American guitarists
20th-century American male musicians